Georges Le Faure (12 June 1856 – 25 May 1953) was a French writer who authored many popular novels, including swashbuckling ones.

Life and career 
On 2 January 1906, he married Magdeleine Boucherit.

Bibliography 
1901 : Nicolas Pepoff - 2 volumes - Bibliothèque des grandes aventures -Tallandier
1926 : Les Voleurs d'or, 1899,  # 106
1902 - 1904 : Le Chevalier de Latude
1910 : Kadidjar la rouge, Les Beaux Romans Illustration de Gaston de Fonseca
1925 : La Course au milliard
 Un descendant de Robinson, Livre national-Aventures et Voyages # 24
1926 : Le Carré diabolique, Livre national-Aventures et Voyages # 86
1936 : La Brigande
1937 : La voix d'en face -  # 7
  s. d.  Madame Tambour , édition Emile Gaillard, 319.p, 100 illustrations by

See also 
 Magdeleine Boucherit Le Faure

20th-century French novelists
Writers from Paris
1856 births
1953 deaths